Enrique Muiño (July 5, 1881 in A Laracha, Spain – May 24, 1956 in Buenos Aires, Argentina) was a classic Spanish/Argentine actor who appeared in film between 1913 and his death in 1956.

Born in Spain, Muiño moved to Buenos Aires and began a career in film. He made over 20 film appearances in Argentina and the United States playing lead roles in films such as the 1954 film, The Grandfather with Mecha Ortiz, and Su mejor alumno (1944) for which he won the Silver Condor Award for Best Actor at the 1945 Argentine Film Critics Association Awards.

He died in Buenos Aires, Argentina, aged 74.

Selected filmography
 The Gaucho Priest (1941)
 His Best Student (1944)
 Savage Pampas (1945)
 Where Words Fail (1946)
 From Man to Man (1949)

References

External links

 

1881 births
1956 deaths
People from Bergantiños
Spanish emigrants to Argentina
Argentine people of Galician descent
Argentine male film actors
20th-century Argentine male actors
Burials at La Chacarita Cemetery